Kaaf Kangana is a 2019 Pakistani film. It features Sami Khan, Eshal Fayyaz, Fiza Ali and Ayesha Omer. Kaaf Kangana is written and directed by Khalil-ur-Rehman Qamar. The film was released worldwide on 25 October 2019. The film was a critical and commercial failure.

Cast 
 Sami Khan as Ali Mustafa
 Eshal Fayyaz as Kangana
 Ayesha Omer as Gulnaz
 Fiza Ali as Anjali
 Saba Hameed
 Abi Khan as Tony
 Sajid Hasan
 Azra Aftab as Kangana's mother
 Naseem Vicky
 Vasay Chaudhry
 Bilal Chaudhry
 Saiqa as Kangana's grandmother
 Saba Faisal
 Mehmood Aslam
 Arslan idrees
 Neelam Muneer as item number Khwaboon Mein

Marketing and release
The film was initially scheduled for release on Eid al-Adha, but was rescheduled to be released worldwide on 25 October 2019.

Reception 
After its release, critics called it a "massive disappointment" on the face of Lollywood. It also emerged as a box office bomb, grossing low numbers on Friday, earning about 0.19 crores, and then went on to score similar numbers on Saturday (0.2 crores) and Sunday (0.18 crores).

Soundtrack

The soundtrack of the film is composed by 
Naveed Nashad. Lyrics are written by Khalil ul Rehman Qamar.

References

External links 
 

2010s Urdu-language films
2019 films
Pakistani romantic drama films
Lollywood films
India–Pakistan relations in popular culture
Inter-Services Public Relations media productions
Inter-Services Public Relations films
2019 romantic drama films